The Professional 2 is the second studio album by American record producer DJ Clue. It was released on February 27, 2001 via Roc-A-Fella Records, a division of UMG's Def Jam Recordings. It serves as a sequel to his 1998 debut studio album The Professional.

Recording sessions took place at Right Track Studios, at Soundtrack Studios, at Baseline Studios, at The Hit Factory, and at Desert Storms Studios in New York City, at McClair Digital Studios in Canada, at Black Friday Recording Studio in Philadelphia, at Enterprise Studios and at Larrabee West Studios in Los Angeles, at 4 Stars Recording Studios in Florida, and at Mirror Image Studios. Production was handled by Ken "Duro" Ifill, Rick Rock, Bernard "Big Demi" Parker, Charly "Suga Bear" Charles, DJ Twinz, Just Blaze, Rashad Smith, Righteous Funk Boogie, Rockwilder, X-Treme and Clue himself.

It features guest appearances from Beanie Sigel, Jay-Z, Kurupt, Memphis Bleek, Eminem, Royce da 5'9" Busta Rhymes, Cam'ron, Capone-N-Noreaga, Daz Dillinger, DMX, Fabolous, Foxy Brown, Freeway, Geda K, Ghostface Killah, Junior M.A.F.I.A., Lady Luck, Lil' Mo, Mary J. Blige, Method Man, Mobb Deep, Nas, Nature, P. Diddy, Raekwon, Rah Digga, Redman, Snoop Dogg, The Lox, Trick Daddy, Trina, Ty Shaw and Bathgate.

The album peaked at number three on the Billboard 200 chart, and number one on the Top R&B/Hip-Hop Albums chart. It was certified gold by the Recording Industry Association of America on March 28, 2001, and according to Nielsen SoundScan, it has sold 882,000 copies in the United States. Its only single "Back 2 Life 2001" made it to #57 on the Hot R&B/Hip-Hop Songs and #50 on the R&B/Hip-Hop Airplay.

Track listing

Sample credits
Track 2 contains a sample from "Back To Life", written by Paul Hooper, Trevor Romeo, Caron Wheeler and Simon Alban Law
Track 3 contains elements from "Who Shot Ya", written by Christopher Wallace, Sean Combs, Nashiem Myrick, Allie Wrubel and Herbert Magidsion, performed by Notorious B.I.G.
Track 4 contains a sample from "Thumb Tripping (I'll Be Moving)", written by Stephanie Black, Floyd Butler, Ray Cork and Harry Elston, performed by The Friends of Distinction
Track 6 contains a sample from "Share My Love", written by Janie Bradford and Gloria Jones, performed by Rare Earth
Track 17 contains a sample from "I Shot Ya", written by James Todd Smith, Jean-Claude Olivier, Samuel Barnes, James Brown and Lyn Collins, performed by LL Cool J
Track 19 contains a sample from "Shine", written and performed by Lamont Dozier
Track 23 contains a sample from "Incarcerated Scarfaces", written by Robert Diggs and Corey Woods, performed by Raekwon

Personnel

Ernesto Shaw – main artist, producer (tracks: 2, 3, 6, 9-11, 14, 15, 17, 19, 22, 23), co-executive producer
Ken "Duro" Ifill – producer (tracks: 2, 3, 6, 9-11, 14, 15, 17, 19, 22, 23), co-executive producer, recording (tracks: 2, 9-11, 14, 19, 20, 22, 23), mixing (tracks: 2, 4-6, 8-20, 22, 23)
X-treme – producer (track 4)
Denis Tougas – recording (track 4)
Greg Below – recording (track 4)
Bernard "Big Demi" Parker – producer (track 5)
Karl "Bubb" Patrick – recording (track 5)
Kenneth "KJ" Deshields – recording (track 5)
Brian Garten – recording (tracks: 6, 9, 17), assistant mixing (track 6), Pro Tools editing
Paul Gregory – assistant mixing (track 6)
Dana "Rockwilder" Stinson – producer (track 7)
Vinnie Nicoletti – recording & mixing (track 7)
Ricardo Thomas – producer (tracks: 8, 12)
C.J. DeVillar – recording (track 8)
Tyson – assistant mixing (track 8)
Chauncey Mahan – programming & recording (track 12)
Shane "Bermuda" Woodley – assistant engineering (track 12)
Adam Duggins – producer & recording (track 13)
Dylan Dresdow – mixing (track 14)
Pat Viala – recording (track 15)
Charly "Suga Bear" Charles – producer (track 16)
Gimel "Young Guru" Keaton – recording (tracks: 16, 18)
Justin Smith – producer (track 18)
Rashad Smith – producer (track 20)
Tim Olmstead – assistant mixing (track 20)
Raymond Grant – producer (track 21)
Richard Grant – producer (track 21)
Mike Coach – recording (track 21)
Mike Hogan – recording (track 21)
Tommy Uzzo – mixing (track 21)
Tom Coyne – mastering
Skane – A&R, co-executive producer, management
Gee Roberson – A&R
Darcell Lawrence – A&R
Rick Patrick – art direction
Dawud West – artwork & design
Jonathan Mannion – photography
Damon Dash – executive producer
Kareem "Biggs" Burke – executive producer
Shawn "Jay-Z" Carter – executive producer, vocals (tracks: 3, 12)
Deidre L. Graham – management
Chaka Pilgrim – management
Gizelle Galang – legal counsel
Jonathan Lieberman – legal counsel
Sean John Combs – vocals (track 1)
Mary Jane Blige – vocals (track 2)
Jason Terrance Phillips – vocals (tracks: 2, 6)
Earl Simmons – vocals (track 4)
Leslie Edward Pridgen – vocals (track 5)
Dwight Equan Grant – vocals (tracks: 5, 12)
Cameron Giles – vocals (track 6)
John David Jackson – vocals (track 6)
Jermaine Baxter – vocals (track 6)
Sean Divine Jacobs – vocals (track 6)
David Styles – vocals (track 6)
Rashia Tashan Fisher – vocals (track 7)
Trevor George Smith Jr. – vocals (track 7)
Corey Woods – vocals (track 8)
Dennis Coles – vocals (track 8)
Clifford Smith – vocals (track 9)
Marshall Bruce Mathers III – vocals (track 9)
Ryan Daniel Montgomery – vocals (track 9)
Cynthia Loving – vocals (track 10)
Calvin Cordozar Broadus – vocals (track 11)
Ricardo "Kurupt" Brown – vocals (tracks: 11, 12)
Delmar Drew Arnaud – vocals (track 12)
Malik Cox – vocals (tracks: 12, 18)
Stephen Garrett – additional vocals (track 12)
Maurice Young – vocals (track 13)
Katrina "Trina" Taylor – vocals (track 13)
Nasir Jones – vocals (track 14)
Brian James – guitar (track 14)
Charlie Bereal – keyboards (track 14)
Inga DeCarlo Fung Marchand – vocals (track 15)
Antoine "Larceny" Spain – vocals (track 16)
Jamel "Bristal" Fisher – vocals (track 16)
James Lloyd – vocals (track 16)
Kimberly Jones – vocals (track 16)
Lionel Evans – vocals (track 17)
Gary Anthony Grainger – vocals (track 18)
Kiam Akasi Holley – vocals (track 19)
Victor Santiago, Jr. – vocals (track 19)
Albert Johnson – vocals (track 20)
Kejuan Waliek Muchita – vocals (track 20)
Reginald "Reggie" Noble – vocals (track 21)
Paul "Muggs" Cain – vocals (track 22)
Shanell Jones – vocals (track 22)
Ty Shaun Johnson – vocals (track 23)

Charts

Weekly charts

Year-end charts

Certifications

See also
List of Billboard number-one R&B albums of 2001

References

External links

2001 albums
Sequel albums
DJ Clue? albums
Roc-A-Fella Records albums
Albums produced by DJ Clue?
Albums produced by Rick Rock
Albums produced by Just Blaze
Albums produced by Rockwilder
Albums produced by Rashad Smith
Def Jam Recordings albums